The Kurdish Mastiff, Assyrian Shepherd, or Pishdar dog is a dog landrace native to the mountainous Kurdistan Region in Iraq. This dog is often used as a livestock guardian against predators and number around a few thousand heads. They have been compared to the Kangal Dog and the Akbash.

Description 
The weight of the adult dogs increases with age and can reach 80 kg. The average is at 73.50 kg reaching from 67 kg in Sangasar to 80 kg in Qira Diza. The average body length is about 75 cm with the back length of aged dogs reaching over 88 cm.

History 
In 1892, John Paul Dudley published a medical treatise on dogs and mentioned the Kurdish Mastiff:

Image gallery

See also
 Dogs portal

References

Livestock guardian dogs
Rare dog breeds
Dog breeds originating in Asia